Liberty Radio is a UK radio broadcaster and company based in London, England that, is transmitted free to air from the Astra 2F  satellite at 28.2° East to most of Europe, and on the Internet, but not on analog or DAB terrestrial radio. The station is also available to subscribers to BSkyB on the Sky EPG at LCN 186. The company started as Viva 963, broadcasting on terrestrial radio, predominantly for women, and was later renamed. It  lost its terrestrial broadcasting licence in 2002 after being acquired by the Universal Church of the Kingdom of God (UCKG); the broadcasting slot was taken over by Buzz Asia, with different content.

History

Viva 963
The station started on 3 July 1995 as Viva 963, a service of talk and pop aimed at women devised by public relations consultant Lynne Franks. It broadcast on 963 kHz on medium wave from a transmitter at Lea Bridge Road, Leyton. A second transmitter, broadcasting on 972 kHz, was later added at Glade Lane, Southall, Middlesex.

963 Liberty (Fayed)
In May 1996 the station was sold to Mohammed Al Fayed, owner of Harrods and chairman of Fulham Football Club, who renamed the station Liberty Radio. For a time it broadcast commentaries of Fulham FC's home and away football games.

Presenters
Presenters before UCKG ownership:
 Toby Anstis
 Zoë Ball
 Simon Bates
 Sean Bolger
 Bruno Brookes
 Nino Firetto
 Emma Forbes
 David Hamilton
 Mike Hollingsworth
 Caron Keating
 Carol McGiffin
 Sally Meen
 Anna Raeburn
 Chris Reardon
 Richard Skinner
 Penny Smith
 Michele Stephens
 Anthea Turner

Liberty Radio (UCKG)
In 2000 Al Fayed sold the station to the Universal Church of the Kingdom of God (UCKG);

The broadcasting slot
UCKG were not allowed to change the format to religious programming, but did broadcast programmes linked to their UCKG Help Centres in the evenings. In February 2001 Ofcom issued a "Yellow Card" to Liberty Radio over religious content and giving undue prominence to its owners, the UCKG, breaching two rules of the Advertising and Sponsorship Code. Changes were made as a result.

At the time there were rules preventing stations owned by religious organisations from owning digital radio licences in the UK. Therefore, Liberty could not move onto DAB, and did not get an automatic license renewal. Their broadcasting licence was readvertised, and was awarded on 12 November 2002 to Club Asia, who took over 963 and 972 MW at midnight on 3 July 2003. Club Asia went into administration in August 2009 and was taken over by Sunrise Radio Group, itself owned by Litt Corporation, who branded it "Buzz Asia", later "Buzz Radio".

Programming

Since the loss of the terrestrial broadcasting licence Liberty Radio has been broadcasting  Christian music, and a variety of talk shows on the Internet, Sky Digital and the Eurobird satellite.

References 

Internet radio stations in the United Kingdom